Marc Gibbs is an American farmer and politician who served as a member of Idaho House of Representatives for the 32A district from 2012 to 2022. He previously represented the 31A district from 2008 to 2012.

Elections

House of Representatives District 32 Seat A

2016 
Gibbs was unopposed in the Republican primary and the general election.

2014 
Gibbs was unopposed in the Republican primary.

Gibbs defeated Alice Stevenson , earning 73.5% of the vote.

2012 
Redistricted to 32A, Gibbs was unopposed in the Republican primary.

Gibbs defeated Bob Fitzgerald , earning 79.1% of the vote.

House of Representatives District 31 Seat A

2010 
Gibbs was unopposed in the Republican primary and the general election.

2008 
When four-term Republican Representatives Larry C. Bradford retired and left the seat open, Gibbs won the May 27, 2008, Republican primary with 3,166 votes (46.7%) against Neal Larson and Rex Steele;

Gibbs was unopposed for the general election.

Personal life 
Gibbs's father was Jack Gibbs (d.1972), a cattle and potato farmer in Idaho. Gibbs' mother was Afton Allsop Gibbs (1916–2015).

In 1970, Gibbs earned a Bachelor of Sceince degree in finance from Utah State University. In 1972, Gibbs became the president and owner of Gibbs Farms.

Gibbs's wife is Bonne Gibbs. They have two children. Gibbs and his family live in Grace, Idaho.

Awards 
 2015 Eastern Idaho Agriculture Hall of Fame.
 2020 Ag All Star. Presented by Food Producers of Idaho in Boise, Idaho.

References

External links
 Marc Gibbs at the Idaho Legislature
 Marc Gibbs at ballotpedia.org
 Marc Gibbs at linkedin.com

Year of birth missing (living people)
Place of birth missing (living people)
Living people
Republican Party members of the Idaho House of Representatives
People from Grace, Idaho
Utah State University alumni
21st-century American politicians